Bruno da Silva Costa (born 28 March 2000), known as Bruno Silva or just Bruno, is a Brazilian footballer who plays as a forward for Chapecoense.

Career statistics

Honours
Atlético Mineiro
Campeonato Mineiro: 2020

Chapecoense
Campeonato Brasileiro Série B: 2020

References

External links
Chapecoense official profile 

2000 births
Living people
Sportspeople from Rio Grande do Sul
Brazilian footballers
Association football forwards
Campeonato Brasileiro Série A players
Campeonato Brasileiro Série B players
Associação Chapecoense de Futebol players
Clube Atlético Mineiro players